"The Half of it, Dearie' Blues" is a song composed by George Gershwin, with lyrics by Ira Gershwin. It was introduced by Fred Astaire and Kathlene Martyn in the 1924 musical Lady be Good.

Recordings 
 Fred Astaire with George Gershwin at the piano - Fred Astaire - Complete London Sessions. In this first ever recording of the number, on April 19, 1926, Astaire includes a short tap-dancing section and asks Gershwin: "How's that, George," to which Gershwin replies: "That's fine, Freddy, keep going."
 Ella Fitzgerald - Ella Fitzgerald Sings the George and Ira Gershwin Songbook (1959)

References 

Songs with music by George Gershwin
Songs with lyrics by Ira Gershwin
Fred Astaire songs
1924 songs
Songs from Lady, Be Good (musical)